Dr. Ajay Dharam Singh is an Indian politician who is the current Member of the Karnataka Legislative Assembly from Jevaragi constituency and Deputy Leader of the opposition in Karnataka Legislative Assembly from 12 March 2020. He is the son of former chief minister (Karnataka) Dharam Singh.

After completion of his M.B.B.S. degree, he founded Accident Relief Care in Bangalore in 2000. Accident Relief Care is a service-oriented organisation providing necessary insurance to the accident victims. Around 50000 accident victims have been helped by his organisation all over India.

He got involved in social service activities from 2005 onwards. He organised the first health camp at Jewargi in 2005. The health camp is being organised every year at Jewargi from 2005 onwards. Around 30,000 people benefited from these health camps. He founded the Dharam Singh Foundation, an NGO in 2007. The Dharam Singh Foundation provides free ambulance service to the Jewargi taluka people from 2007 onwards. Presently there are eight ambulances available round the clock for the service of Jewargi taluka people.

Dr. Ajay Singh is an avid sportsman. During his college life he regularly participated in volleyball and cricket. In tenpin bowling, he represented India at the Doha Asian Games, World Championships and Asian indoor meet. He also captained Karnataka to its maiden national tenpin bowling team title in 2007. Currently he is the vice-president of the Tenpin Bowling Federation (India).

He was the general secretary, Youth congress Karnataka from 1999 to 2009. He became KPCC member in the year 2005. In 2010, Gulbarga South by-election was held due to sudden demise of the sitting BJP MLA Chandrasekhar Patil Revnoor. Dr. Ajay Singh took the challenge to fight the election from Congress in this unknown turf. He was defeated by the widow of the late MLA by a narrow margin. He took the charge of election campaigning and management for his father, Mr. Dharam Singh, in the 2009 parliament election from Bidar. Mr. Dharam Singh won the election by 39619 votes. He led the Congress team in Jewargi Taluk in 2010 local body election. In the election, Congress won 4 Zila panchayat seats out of 6 available seats and 14 taluk panchayat seats out of 22 available seats. He became a unanimous choice of the MLA candidate in the 2013 assembly election. In 2013 assembly election of Karnataka, he defeated the sitting BJP MLA, Dodapagouda by 36700 votes from Jewargi. This is the highest margin in the Gulbarga district and 3rd best margin in the overall Hyderabad-Karnataka region.

Personal life 
Dr. Ajay Singh was born in Gulbarga, Karnataka, to Mr. Dharam Singh and Mrs. Prabhavathi. He completed M.B.B.S (1992 Batch) from M.S Ramaiah Medical College, Bangalore. Dr. Ajay Singh is married to Shwetha Singh. The couple has a daughter Saina Singh and a son Arhaan Jai Singh.

Political career 
 General secretary Youth congress, 1999–2009.
 Active participation in political activities at Jewargi since 1999.
 Became a Karnataka Pradesh Congress Committee member in 2005.
 Election campaigning and management for Dharam Singh in the 2009 parliament election, Bidar leading to his victory by 39619 votes.
 Contested by-election from Gulbarga south in 2010.
 Led the Congress team in Jewargi Taluk in 2010 local body election. In the election, Congress won 66.66% Zila panchayat seats and 63.63% taluk panchayat seats.
 Member of the Legislative Assembly, Jewargi, Gulbarga District, Karnataka, since May 2013

Social welfare 
 Founded Accident Relief Care, Bangalore 2000 to provide necessary support to the accident victims.
 Organized the first health camp, Jewargi 2005. The health camp is being organised every year at Jewargi from 2005 onwards. Around 30,000 people have been helped from these health camps so far.
 Founded the Dharam Singh Foundation, Jewargi 2007. It provides free ambulance service to the Jewargi taluka people from 2007 onwards. Presently there are eight ambulances available round the clock for the service of Jewargi taluka people.

Sports activities 
 Represented India in Asian Championship, Bangkok 2003 in tenpin bowling.
 Represented India in World Championship, Malaysia 2004 in tenpin bowling.
 One of six team members at the Doha Asian Games, 2006 in tenpin bowling.
 Captain of the national team at the indoor Asian games, Macua 2007 in tenpin bowling
 He is the presently vice-president of the Tenpin Bowling Federation (India).

References

External links 
 An Interview with Dr. Ajay Singh

Living people
People from Kalaburagi
People from Bidar
Karnataka MLAs 2013–2018
Indian National Congress politicians from Karnataka
Karnataka MLAs 2018–2023
1974 births